Veronika Tjelle Flåt (born 9 October 1979) is a Norwegian actress who is known for the movies Kamilla and the Thief and Kamilla and the Thief II, in which she played "Kamilla". She has also had a role as "Siri Jordmor" in Barnevandrer Yohan. She lives in Mandal and is married to Olav Tjelle.

References

External links

1979 births
Living people
Norwegian film actresses